Slobodan Agoč (born 18 January 1977) is a Serbian professional basketball coach and former player.

Personal life 
His son, Stefan (born 2002) is a basketball player, also. Stefan was a member of the Serbia national under-16 team at the 2018 FIBA Europe Under-16 Championship.

References

External links
 Eurobasket profile
 Basketball profile
 Proballers profile

1977 births
Living people
Basketball League of Serbia players
KK Borovica players
KK Beopetrol/Atlas Beograd players
KK MZT Skopje players
KK Novi Sad players
KK Lovćen players
KK Sloga players
KK Sutjeska players
KK Vojvodina players
KK Vojvodina Srbijagas players
KK Zastava players
Serbian men's basketball coaches
Serbian men's basketball players
Serbian expatriate basketball people in Bahrain
Serbian expatriate basketball people in Iran
Serbian expatriate basketball people in Montenegro
Serbian expatriate basketball people in Romania
Serbian expatriate basketball people in North Macedonia
Power forwards (basketball)